The second USS Elfin (SP-965) was a United States Navy patrol vessel in commission from 1917 to 1918.

Elfin was built in 1911 as a private motorboat of the same name by Britt Brothers at Lynn, Massachusetts. In July 1917, the U.S. Navy leased her from her owner, Alfred W. Gibbs of Wayne, Pennsylvania, for use as a section patrol boat during World War I. She was commissioned as USS Elfin (SP-965) on 26 July 1917.

Assigned to the 4th Naval District, Elfin served on patrol duties through the end of World War I.

Elfin was returned to Gibbs on 22 November 1918.

Notes

References
 
 Department of the Navy Naval History and Heritage Command Online Library of Selected Images: U.S. Navy Ships: USS Elfin (SP-965), 1917-1918
 NavSource Online: Section Patrol Craft Photo Archive Elfin (SP 965)

Patrol vessels of the United States Navy
World War I patrol vessels of the United States
Ships built in Lynn, Massachusetts
1911 ships